Milejów  is a village in the administrative district of Gmina Milejów, within Łęczna County, Lublin Voivodeship, in eastern Poland. The parish church is the Church of Assumption of Blessed Virgin and St Anthony of Padua.

The village has a population of 2,676.

References

Villages in Łęczna County